Marian Banaś (born 13 July 1955) is a Polish politician and civil servant. He served twice as Chief Executive of the Customs Service from 2005 to 2008 and 2015 to 2017. He briefly served in politics as the Minister of Finance for the First Cabinet of Mateusz Morawiecki from 4 June to 30 August 2019. He now serves as the President of the Supreme Audit Office, one of the oldest state institutions in Poland.

References

1955 births
Finance Ministers of Poland
21st-century Polish politicians
Living people
People from Nowy Targ County
Jagiellonian University alumni
Law and Justice politicians